Serianna was a metalcore band from Madison, Wisconsin. The band formed in 2006, but disbanded in 2013 after 2 studio albums and additional really good tours after removing 2 members after the first studio album. Chris Nutting started a new project called Steady/Steady which, instead of Metalcore/Post-hardcore, this new band plays Indie Rock . Guitarist Kris Meyer-Ruef later started playing in a new band called Deadset.

Background
Drummer Chris Ferraro states:"The guitarist Jason Becker had a song called Serriana (you can find really cool videos of it on YouTube.) The name was our take on that name. Jason’s whole story is very inspiring. He faced huge obstacles and never gave up, and is one of the best guitar players I’ve ever seen."

Music history
They commenced their music recording careers in 2006, with their first studio album, Inheritors, that was released by Bullet Tooth Records, on August 23, 2011. Their subsequent studio album, Define Me, was released on August 13, 2013, from Bullet Tooth Records.

Members

Last Known Line-up
Chris Nutting - Vocals (Steady/Steady)
Kris Meyer-Ruef - Guitar (Deadset)
Rocky Morgan - Guitar
Jimmy McClanahan - Bass
Chris Ferraro - Drums

Former Members
James Milbrandt - Guitar
Lee Milbrandt - Bass

Discography
 Inheritors (August 23, 2011, Bullet Tooth)
 Define Me (August 13, 2013, Bullet Tooth)

References

External links
 Serianna on Bullet Tooth Records

Musical groups established in 2009
Musical groups disestablished in 2013